Sapphire Central is a rural locality in the Central Highlands Region, Queensland, Australia. The town of Sapphire is within the locality. Sapphires are mined extensively in the area.

Sapphire was one of three towns within the locality of The Gemfields (the others being Anakie and Rubyvale) until 17 April 2020, when the Queensland Government decided to replace The Gemfields with three new localities (Sapphire Central, Anakie Siding and Rubyvale) based around each of the three towns respectively.

Geography 
Mount Bullock is in the north-west of the locality and west of the town.

In the south-west of the locality is The Three Sisters Range (midpoint ) which extends south into Anakie Siding.

History 
Sapphire Provisional School opened in 1904. On 1 January 1909 it became Sapphire State School. It closed in 1939.

Sapphire was one of three towns within the locality of The Gemfields (the others being Anakie and Rubyvale) until 17 April 2020, when the Queensland Government decided to replace The Gemfields with three new localities (Sapphire Central, Anakie Siding and Rubyvale) based around each of the three towns respectively.

Education 
There are no schools in Sapphire Central. The nearest primary school is in Anakie. The nearest secondary school is Emerald State High School in Emerald.

References

External links
 
  — shows the town of Sapphire
Map and facilities list
A Gemfields home page
gemfest

Mining towns in Queensland
Towns in Queensland
Central Highlands Region
Localities in Queensland